The Science Development Foundation (SDF) of Azerbaijan was established by presidential order on 21 October 2009. The Foundation was designed to implement scientific projects, organize scientific events, and support scientists and scientific  organizations, and enhance the role of science in all social-economic fields. Funding for the Foundation is provided by the state budget.  Mehriban Imanova was appointed Executive director of the SDF on 20 September 2019.

The SDF interacts with over a dozen science-related organizations in Azerbaijan. The Foundation also participates in international projects with scientific organizations in France, Belarus, South Korea, Georgia, and Russia.

History 
Science Development Foundation was established in accordance with the presidential order dated October 21, 2009. The establishment of the Foundation aimed at implementation of scientific projects and organizing scientific events, activities of the scientists, supporting scientific collectives, scientific organizations, scientists of the academy and education system, state and non-state organizations.

Science of Development Foundation set up a system aiming at diffusing scientific information of Azerbaijan abroad, assisting young researches and scientists to extend their knowledge, experiences, to improve level of science in the country, to develop gadget base, to organize participation of scientists in international scientific conferences, seminars, trainings, to organize trainings, seminars over the country. An electron information bank was created in the Foundation. The information bank meeting European scientific standards includes the information on the most active young scientists and specialists working in Azerbaijan, as well as their scientific activities and the degree of activeness.

In order to support young scientists materially and morally, the Foundation attracts them to scientific valuation. They attend the valuation as independent scientific experts.
The foundation is in closely cooperation with the National Academy of Sciences (NAS) and the Ministry of the Youth and Sport.

The Foundation investigates the natural resources, cultural and historical heritage in the country. One of the goals of the Foundation is to enhance the role of the science in all social-economic fields, solving the social problems, develop scientific information and innovations, to study international experience gained in science, to establish relations with international scientific foundations, organizations, committees.

Mehriban Imanova was appointed the Executive director of the SDF of Azerbaijan according to the Presidential order dated 20 September 2019.

Financing 

Science Development Foundation is financed at the expense of the state budget. The government allocated 7 022 400 manats to the Foundation in 2010 (No.187, 26 November 2009; paragraph 2.1.8.14), 7 035 079 manats in 2011 (No.358, 24 November 2010; paragraph 2.1.8.2),  7 034 930 manats in 2012 (No.546, 19 December 2011; paragraph 2.1.10.2), 7 047 480 manats in 2013 (No.760, 13 December 2012; paragraph 2.1.9.2), 7 960 548 manats in 2014 (No.55, 19 December 2013; paragraph 2.1.9.2.), 7 585 697 manats in 2015 (No.413, 22 December 2014; paragraph 1.1.3.2.), 7 525 505 manats in 2016 (No.698, 7 December 2015; paragraph 1.1.3.2.), 500 000 manats in 2017 (1180, 27 December 2016; paragraph 1.1.3.2).

International relations 
In 2011 the Foundation signed a memorandum and intention protocol on announcing joint grant competitions with French Scientific Researches Center (CNRS) and Belarusian Republican Foundation for Fundamental Research. At the same time the Foundation cooperates with South Korea, Georgia and Russia.

In 2016 the First Deputy Chairman of the State Committee on Science and Technology of the Republic of Belarus Andrey Kosovskiy visited Science Development Foundation. The cooperation between two organizations has been established on the fields of science and innovations.

In 2017 partners of "TransTech Capital" Fund Simon Robeson, David Livesley and Mahmut N. Sinoplu visited the Science Development Foundation. The guests and head of Science Development Foundation spoke about the cooperation plans for 2017, touched some issues regarding with supporting events and trainings on innovative projects, transfer of the technologies.

Science-related organizations in Azerbaijan 
 Institute of Physics
 Institute of Radiation problems
 Institute of Information Technology
 Institute of Mathematics and mechanics
 Astrophysical Observatory named after N. Tusi
 Institute of Petrochemical Processes named after Y.H. Mammadaliyev
 Institute of Polymer materials
 Institute of Oil and Gas
 Institute of Molecular Biology and Biotechnology
 Institute of Physiology
 Institute of Zoology
 Institute of Control Systems
 Central Botanical Garden
 National Museum of Azerbaijan History
 Institute of History named after A. Bakhikhanov
 Institute of Oriental Studies named after Ziya Bunyadov

References

External links

 https://azertag.az/en/xeber/230962
 https://www.azernews.az/nation/85097.html
 http://www.math.md/files/download/ENews/2012/RegionalWorkshop/Experience_lessons_learnt_and_steps_towards_collaboration.pdf